The miswak (miswaak, siwak, sewak,  or ) is a teeth-cleaning twig made from the Salvadora persica tree (known as arāk, أراك, in Arabic). It is reputed to have been used over 7,000 years ago. The miswak's properties have been described thus: "Apart from their antibacterial activity which may help control the formation and activity of dental plaque, they can be used effectively as a natural toothbrush for teeth cleaning. Such sticks are effective, inexpensive, common, available, and contain many medical properties". It also features prominently in Islamic hygienical jurisprudence.

The miswak is predominant in Muslim-inhabited areas. It is commonly used in the Arabian peninsula, the Horn of Africa, North Africa, parts of the Sahel, the Indian subcontinent, Central Asia, Southeast Asia and Caucasus. In Malaysia, miswak is known as Kayu Sugi (Malay for 'chewing stick').

Science 

The World Health Organization also known as the WHO recommended the use of the miswak in 1986, but in 2000, an international consensus report on oral hygiene concluded that further research was needed to document the effect of the miswak. Some of this further research has been done on a population of 203, and concluded, "that the periodontal status of miswak users in this Sudanese population is better than that of toothbrush users". Yet another comparative study conducted on a sampling of 480 Saudi Arabian adults found that "the level of need for periodontal care in the sample chosen is low when compared with the findings of similar studies undertaken in other countries. The frequent use of the 'Miswak' was associated with a lower need for treatment".

Miswak extract vs. oral disinfectants
Studies indicate that Salvadora persica extract exhibits low antimicrobial activity compared to other oral disinfectants and anti-plaque agents like triclosan and chlorhexidine gluconate.

However, the benefits of triclosan were discounted by the United States Food and Drug Administration in 2016 and its safety is uncertain as a hygiene product ingredient. Chlorhexidine gluconate was also linked to serious allergic reactions, albeit rarely.

Chemical composition 
Salvadorine and benzylisothiocyanate appear to be responsible for the antibacterial activity of Miswak. The plant also contains insoluble fluoride in high concentration, calcium, salicylic acid, and some antioxidants of unclear function.

Other considerations 
A 2016 paper has been published comparing human DNA left on used miswak and toothbrushes, including the effect of time, to determine whether miswak is a reasonable source of DNA when found at crime scenes. The conclusion was that miswak contains a high enough quantity of DNA, and retained good DNA profiling; and when compared to toothbrushes, miswak is a reasonable source of DNA for forensic profiling. In addition, time of storage up to four months had no or little effects on results.

Religious prescriptions

The use of the miswak is frequently advocated in the hadith (the traditions relating to the life of Muhammad). Situations where the miswak is recommended to be used include before or during wudu (ablution), on waking up in the morning, before going to the mosque, before entering one's house, before and after going on a journey, on Fridays, before sleeping and after waking up, when experiencing hunger or thirst and before entering any good gathering. 

In addition to strengthening the gums, preventing tooth decay and eliminating toothaches, the miswak is said to halt further decay that has already set in. Furthermore, it is reputed to create a fragrance in the mouth, eliminate bad breath, improve sensitivity of taste-buds and promote cleaner teeth.

Hadiths concerning the miswak

It is often mentioned that the Islamic prophet Muhammad recommended the miswak'''s use. He is quoted in various hadith extolling its virtues:"Siwak" at searchtruth.com.

 Alternative forms 
Modern uses of arāk'' wood in oral hygiene expands beyond miswak itself. Extracts containing its active components have been added to mouthwash and toothpaste. There is also a German patent for similar formulations in pets.

References

Further reading
Islamic Research on Miswak (Dr. Al Sahli)
 Khan, Tehmeena, Toothbrush (Miswak), in Muhammad in History, Thought, and Culture: An Encyclopedia of the Prophet of God (2 vols.), Edited by C. Fitzpatrick and A. Walker, Santa Barbara, ABC-CLIO, 2014.

External links

Article on Miswak
The Miswaak Page - Guidelines and Information
IslamWeb

Dental equipment
Traditional medicine
Islamic culture
Islamic terminology